Full Fathom Five or Fathom Five may refer to:

Shakespeare
 The verse passage "Ariel's Song" from Shakespeare's The Tempest
 "Full Fathom Five", a 1611 setting by Robert Johnson of Shakespeare's lyrics
 "Full Fathom Five", a setting of "Ariel's Song" in Three Shakespeare Songs by Ralph Vaughan Williams

Arts and entertainment

Film and television
 Full Fathom Five (film), 1990
 "Full Fathom Five", a 1953 episode of the TV series Victory at Sea 
 "Full Fathom Five," a 1968 episode of the original Hawaii Five-O
 "Full Fathom Five", a 1976 episode of TV series Movin' On
 "Full Fathom Five", an episode of 1972 TV series The Adventurer
 "Full Fathom Five", an episode of 2018 TV series Lodge 49

Music
 Full Fathom Five (band)
 Full Fathom Five (album), by Clutch, 2008
 Full Fathom Five: Video Field Recordings, by Clutch, 2008
 Full Fathom Five, a 1994 album by Sub Sub
 "Full Fathom Five", a song by Marianne Faithfull from the 1965 album Come My Way
 "Full Fathom Five", a song by Pete Seeger from the 1966 album Dangerous Songs!?
 "Full Fathom Five", a song by Susie Ibarra, Wadada Leo Smith and John Zorn from the 2003 album 50th Birthday Celebration Volume 8
 "Full Fathom Five", a song by Seaman Dan from the 2003 album Sailing Home
 "Full Fathom Five", a song by Méav Ní Mhaolchatha from the 2002 album Silver Sea
 "Full Fathom Five", an art song from The Michael Nyman Songbook, 1992
 "Full Fathom Five", a B-side variation of "Elephant Stone" by The Stone Roses, 1988
 "Full Fathom Five", a 1922 composition by Martin Shaw
 "Full Fathom Five", a 1923 song composition by Ernest Walker
 "Full Fathom Five", a 2014 composition by Errollyn Wallen for the Melodia Women's Choir
 "Full Fathom Five", a 1972 cantata by Shena Fraser
 "Full Fathom Five", a 2014 choral composition by Jaakko Mäntyjärvi
 "Full Fathom Five", a 2012 opera composition by Thomas Adès
 "Full Fathom Five", a c. 1890 part song composition by Charles Wood
 "Full Fathom Five", a song composition by John Ireland (1879–1962)
 "Five Fathoms", a song by Everything but the Girl from the 1999 album Temperamental

Literature
 Full Fathom Five, a 2014 novel by Max Gladstone
 Full Fathom Five, a 2003 novel by Kate Humphrey
 Full Fathom Five, a 1958 novel by Lew Dietz
 Full Fathom Five, a 1956 novel by Hugh Sykes Davies
 Full Fathom Five, a 1968 novel by J. E. Macdonnell in the Horwitz Naval Series
 Full Fathom Five: Ocean Warming and a Father’s Legacy, a 2013 book by Gordon Waterman Chaplin
 Full Fathom Five, a 1993 poetry collection John Kinsella
 "Full Fathom Five", a poem by Sylvia Plath from The Colossus and Other Poems, 1960
 "Full Fathom Five", a poem by Samuel Menashe
 Fathom Five (novel), by Robert Westall, 1979

Other uses in arts and entertainment
Full Fathom Five, a 1947 painting by Jackson Pollock
 "Full Fathom Five" (audio drama), in the Doctor Who Unbound series
Full Fathom Five, a work public art in Somerset
 Full Fathom Five, a 1932 play by Lewis Gielgud
 "The Fathom-Five Matter", a 1956 episode of radio drama episode of Yours Truly, Johnny Dollar
 Fathom Five (comics), a Marvel Comics character

Other uses
 Fathom Five National Marine Park, in Georgian Bay, Ontario, Canada
 Full Fathom Five, a transmedia production company of James Frey

See also 
 Fathom (disambiguation)
 Rich and Strange, a 1931 Hitchcock film, the title being an allusion to words of Ariel's song